GENLN2 is suite of software programs that provide a general purpose line by line atmospheric transmittance and radiance model.

See also
List of atmospheric radiative transfer codes
Atmospheric radiative transfer codes
Absorption spectrum
MODTRAN
HITRAN

References
Edwards, D. P. (1992), GENLN2: A general line-by-line atmospheric transmittance and radiance model, Version 3.0 description and users guide, NCAR/TN-367-STR, National Center for Atmospheric Research, Boulder, Co.
Edwards, D. P. (1987), GENLN2: The new Oxford line-by-line atmospheric transmission/radiance model, Dept. of Atmospheric, Oceanic and Planetary Physics, Memorandum 87.2, University of Oxford, UK.

Atmospheric radiative transfer codes